Boc Maxima is a limited-release studio album self-released by Boards of Canada on cassette in 1996 via their label Music70. The album preceded their more public releases on Skam and Warp. Many of its tracks were reused on their early EPs and 1998 debut LP Music Has the Right to Children. It was broadcast in full on the radio program Disengage in 2002, but has never been officially re-released.

Background
The physical cassette production of the album was limited to 50 copies world-wide, which were handed out to friends and family.

"Wildlife Analysis", "Boc Maxima", "Roygbiv", "Turquoise Hexagon Sun" and "One Very Important Thought" later appeared on Music Has the Right to Children. "Everything You Do Is a Balloon", "June 9th", "Nlogax" and "Turquoise Hexagon Sun" also appear on Hi Scores. "Rodox Video", "Nova Scotia Robots", "Skimming Stones", "Carcan", "M9" and "Original Nlogax" appeared on A Few Old Tunes (albeit in slightly different forms). "Sixtyniner" first appeared on Twoism. A longer version of "Chinook" appears on the Aquarius single.

Some songs appear in slightly different iterations. The speech on "One Very Important Thought" differs between the two releases, as does the name of the song "Boc Maxima", renamed "Bocuma" for Music Has the Right to Children. Whereas the original version of "One Very Important Thought" was taken directly from the ending of the 1982 pornographic film A Brief Affair, the version on Music Has the Right to Children was re-recorded with a reference to Boards of Canada inserted. The original speech was spoken by Lisa DeLeeuw, while the Music Has the Right to Children version was re-recorded by a voice actor — this may have been due to DeLeeuw's alleged death from AIDS in 1993 (she was, in fact, still alive). The song "Timeless" by John Abercrombie used in the background of the original speech can be faintly heard in the background as the song fades out.

"Niagara", "Red Moss", "Concourse" and "Whitewater" are exclusive to this release.

Track listing
 "Wildlife Analysis" – 1:21
 "Chinook" – 4:58
 "Rodox Video" – 0:38
 "Everything You Do Is a Balloon" – 7:04
 "Boc Maxima" – 1:32
 "Roygbiv" – 2:30
 "Nova Scotia Robots" – 1:23
 "June 9th" – 5:15
 "Niagara" – 0:54
 "Skimming Stones" – 2:00
 "Sixtyniner" – 5:43
 "Red Moss" – 6:21
 "Concourse" – 1:42
 "Carcan" – 1:47
 "Nlogax" – 6:53
 "M9" – 3:43
 "Original Nlogax" – 1:09
 "Turquoise Hexagon Sun" – 5:11
 "Whitewater" – 6:18
 "One Very Important Thought" – 1:17

References

Boards of Canada albums
1996 albums